The Esperanza Fire was a large, wind-driven, arson-caused wildfire that started on October 26, 2006, in a river wash near Cabazon, California, west of Palm Springs, California. On October 30, 2006, the fire was fully contained.

Five firefighters died defending a vacant house locally known as the "Octagon" that was ultimately destroyed by the fire: Jason McKay, Jess McLean, Daniel Kurtis Najera, Mark Loutzenhiser and Pablo Cerda.

In June 2009, Raymond Lee Oyler was sentenced to death for starting the fire.

The fire
The fire was started on October 26, 2006, reported near the intersection of Bonita Avenue and Elm Street in Cabazon at 1:11 a.m. It eventually burned an estimated  before containment. The fire caused the deaths of five firefighters, destroyed 34 houses and 20 outbuildings, and damaged the pavement of State Route 243. The damage the fire caused is estimated at more than $9 million and was the worst wildfire caused by arson since 1994.

The fire spread rapidly in moderate Santa Ana winds, and flammable brush due to the fire's proximity to the Chaparral biome, charring  in 18 hours. In comparison, the Ventura County Day Fire burned  in two weeks. There were reports that smoke from the fire could be smelled as far away as San Diego. 

The firefighters who died were overwhelmed by the fire when the winds shifted and blew the fire towards them. They were trying to defend a house above Cabazon, ultimately lost. Captain Mark Loutzenhiser, 43, from Idyllwild, California; Fire Engine Operator Jess "Gus" McLean, 27, from Beaumont, California; Assistant Fire Engine Operator Jason McKay, 27, from Apple Valley, California; Firefighter Pablo Cerda, 23, from Fountain Valley, California; and Firefighter Daniel Hoover-Najera, 20, from San Jacinto, California, were killed defending the "Octagon House".

Mclean and McKay died next to their fire engine without having time to enter it. Hoover-Najera's body was found to the west of the structures they were trying to protect. The surviving two firefighters were transferred to Arrowhead Regional Medical Center, where Loutzenhiser succumbed to his injuries shortly after arriving. Cerda died at 5:08 p.m. PST on October 31, 2006, in Arrowhead Regional Medical Center from his injuries.

On October 26, 2006, FEMA announced it would pay 75% of the costs associated with fighting the fire. The following day, Governor Arnold Schwarzenegger declared a state of emergency in Riverside County and ordered flags at the California Capitol building and all California Department of Forestry stations to be flown at half-staff.

Firefighters from as far away as Alameda County worked to control the blaze.

Criminal investigation

A nearly $600,000 reward was offered for information leading to the arrest and conviction of the arsonist(s). Several governments, as well as private agencies, donated to this reward. The State of California, Riverside County, San Bernardino County, the Morongo Band of Mission Indians, the Soboba Band of Luiseño Indians, and Tim Blixseth, a Coachella Valley logging industry magnate, each donated $100,000.

The Riverside County Sheriff Department's Central Homicide Unit arrested Raymond Lee Oyler, a mechanic from Beaumont, on October 31, 2006, for setting two wildfires in the summer of 2006. Inside his car, authorities found a wig, latex gloves, cigarettes, black spray paint, and a partially burned slingshot that was used to launch incendiary devices into the brush. His DNA was found on two cigarette butts used in other nearby wildfires. "Oyler's girlfriend told police that he had bragged about setting fires and had complained that they weren't big enough. She threatened to leave him if he didn't stop, so he quit for six months, Hestrin said."

The Riverside County Sheriff's Department announced on November 2, 2006, that Oyler also was charged for his involvement with the Esperanza Fire. Overall, he was charged with almost two dozen counts of arson and 17 counts of setting fires with an incendiary device.

Prosecutors alleged that Oyler had set as many as 25 fires throughout the San Gorgonio Pass during the summer of 2006. The fires combined and became more difficult to extinguish. He used a combination of matches and cigarettes to start a fire in Cabazon at the base of the San Jacinto Mountains. "The defense conceded that Oyler set 11 fires, just not the 2006 Esperanza fire that killed five firefighters."

On November 11, 2006, it was announced that Oyler was also a suspect in the 2003 Old Fire. However, another person was later convicted of setting that fire.

After a week of deliberation, a Riverside jury on March 6, 2009, found Oyler guilty of first-degree murder in the deaths of the five firefighters in the Esperanza fire.

On May 9, 2007, Riverside County District Attorney Rod Pacheco said that he planned to seek the death penalty against Oyler.  On June 5, 2009, Oyler was sentenced to death for starting the 2006 Esperanza fire.

Effects

Riverside County is establishing a fund to help the families of the firefighters who were killed fighting the fire.
A public memorial was held on November 5, 2006, at the San Manuel Amphitheater in Devore, CA for the five fallen firefighters.
The community (worldwide) donated over $1.3 Million to the Central County United Way and nearly $400,000 to the Wildland Firefighter Foundation in support of the families of the fallen firefighters. Donations to the surviving families were received from the United States, Australia, New Zealand, Spain, Portugal, France, and the UK.
The United States Congress and the California Legislature both passed laws to ensure the funds would go to the families without taxation of the receiving families, as well as those giving donations being able to consider their donations as tax deductible.

NASA Altair UAV fire mapping mission
The California Office of Emergency Services requested NASA support, and in under 24 hours, the General Atomics Altair (NASA variant of the Predator B) was launched on a 16-hour mission to map the perimeter of the fire. The Altair had just returned from a test mission a day before the Esperanza Fire started. The fire mapping research is a joint project with NASA and the US Forest Service.

See also
2006 California wildfires
Silver Fire
Manzanita Fire

References

External links

 Esperanza Fire Accident Investigation Factual Report
http://www.foxnews.com/story/0,2933,225863,00.html
http://cdfdata.fire.ca.gov/incidents/incidents_details_info?incident_id=161
NBC News
NBC News
http://www.esa.int/esaEO/SEMEKMZBYTE_index_0.html Earth from Space: California’s ‘Esperanza’ fire

2006 California wildfires
San Jacinto Mountains
2006 murders in the United States
Mass murder in 2006
Wildfires in Riverside County, California
Death in Riverside County, California
Crimes in Riverside County, California
California wildfires caused by arson